Amasra District is a district of Bartın Province of Turkey. Its seat is the town Amasra. Its area is 178 km2, and its population is 14,086 (2021).

Composition
There is one municipality in Amasra District:
 Amasra

There are 30 villages in Amasra District:

 Acarlar
 Ahatlar
 Akkonak
 Aliobası
 Bostanlar
 Çakrazboz
 Çakrazova
 Çakrazşeyhler
 Çanakçılar
 Cumayanı
 Esenler
 Göçkün
 Göçkündemirci
 Gömü
 Hatipler
 İnciğez
 İnpiri
 Kalaycı
 Karakaçak
 Kazpınarı
 Kocaköy
 Makaracı
 Saraydüzü
 Şenyurt
 Şükürler
 Tarlaağzı
 Topallar
 Topderesi
 Yahyayazıcılar
 Yukarısal

References

Districts of Bartın Province